Hugh Randall McKay (born January 25, 1967) is a Canadian former professional hockey player. Playing the right wing position, he played in the National Hockey League (NHL) from 1988 to 2003 with the Detroit Red Wings, New Jersey Devils, Dallas Stars and Montreal Canadiens. He was commonly referred to as Randy "The Rocket" Mckay" for not only his physical playstyle and consistent double digit goal seasons, but also most notably for his "head high screamers" or hard slapshots into the upper corner of the net.

Playing career
McKay was selected by the Detroit Red Wings in the sixth round, 113th overall, of the 1985 NHL Entry Draft. He split the 1987–88, 1988–89 and 1989–90 seasons between the Red Wings and their affiliate in the American Hockey League (AHL), the Adirondack Red Wings. McKay stuck with the Wings in the NHL for the 1990–91 season, appearing in 47 games. While showing a scoring touch in the AHL, McKay only scored 4 goals in 83 total games with the Red Wings and was unable to find consistent playing time. Following the season, McKay and Dave Barr were sent by rule of an arbitrator to the New Jersey Devils as compensation for the Red Wings' signing of free agent Troy Crowder. The deal did not work out for the Wings as Crowder only played in seven games for the team before incurring a serious injury. McKay developed into a solid third and fourth line player that the Wings would later covet in the latter part of the decade. It was a move that Red Wings senior vice president Jim Devellano resisted at the time and regretted later.

Although a physical presence on the ice, McKay also contributed offensively, with double-digit goal totals and a positive plus/minus most seasons (including +30 in 1997–98, fourth in the NHL). He is perhaps best remembered among Devils fans for scoring the winning goal in Game 6 of the 1995 Eastern Conference Finals against the Philadelphia Flyers; the Devils won the game 4–2 and went on to win their first Stanley Cup by upsetting the heavily-favoured Detroit Red Wings in four games.

On October 28, 2000, in a regular season game against the Pittsburgh Penguins, McKay and teammate John Madden each scored four goals in a 9–0 win for the Devils. It was the first time since 1922 that two teammates each scored four goals.

McKay was also a member of the Devils when they won the Stanley Cup in 2000 against the Dallas Stars in six games.

On March 19, 2002, McKay was traded (alongside Jason Arnott and a first-round pick in the 2002 NHL Entry Draft) to the Dallas Stars in exchange for Joe Nieuwendyk and Jamie Langenbrunner.

McKay retired after the 2002–03 season, finishing his career in his hometown as a member of the Montreal Canadiens.

Crash line
For a period of time with the New Jersey Devils, McKay was a member of "The Crash Line" alongside Bobby Holík and Mike Peluso.  Head coach Jacques Lemaire created the line to counter the larger skilled players of the Eastern Conference at the time, including Eric Lindros, Cam Neely and Jaromír Jágr. The average weight of the linemates was 215 pounds, and each skater played a physical and aggressive style of hockey. The trio were part of the Devils Stanley Cup championship in 1995. Following the departure of Peluso, Holík and McKay often remained on the same line, which sometimes included Sergei Brylin.

Other
McKay is a graduate of Michigan Technological University (1984–1988). 

McKay splits time between Houghton, Michigan and Marquette, Michigan as has four children: Riley, Kaitlyn, Dawson and McKenna.

Career statistics

References

External links

McKay's OT winner in Game 4 of the 1995 Stanley Cup Quarterfinals
Game 6 game winning goal in the 1995 Conference Finals

1967 births
Living people
Anglophone Quebec people
Canadian ice hockey forwards
Dallas Stars players
Detroit Red Wings draft picks
Detroit Red Wings players
Ice hockey people from Montreal
Michigan Tech Huskies men's ice hockey players
Montreal Canadiens players
New Jersey Devils players
Stanley Cup champions